Mendia or Mendía is a surname of Basque origins. Notable people with the surname include:

Borja Mendía (born 1994), Spanish basketball player
Idoia Mendia (born 1965), Spanish politician
Luis María Mendía (1925–2007), Argentine Navy admiral
Marta Mendía (born 1975), Spanish high jumper

Basque-language surnames